Elizabeth Jens (born 1984) is an Australian propulsion engineer who works at the NASA Jet Propulsion Laboratory.

Early life and education 
Jens is from Torquay, Victoria. She decided at the age of twelve that she wanted to be an astronaut, after seeing a talk from one of the Apollo astronauts in Geelong. She went to school at Sacred Heart College, Geelong, where she was encouraged to study maths and physics. She studied at the University of Melbourne, graduating with a bachelor's degree in mechanical engineering and bachelor's degree in physics in 2008. She attended an introductory course at the International Space University at Ames Research Center. She completed her graduate studies as a Fulbright scholar (sponsored by BHP) and Rotary International Scholar at Stanford University. After her Masters, Jens joined Jet Propulsion Laboratory as an intern, before beginning a PhD in aeronautics and astronautics. Jens was an Amelia Earhart Fellow in 2012 and 2014. She completed her PhD, "Hybrid Rocket Combustion and Applications to Space Exploration Missions" in 2016, under the supervision of Brian Cantwell and Scott Hubbard. Whilst still a student, Jens was recognised as an Emerging Space Industry Leader.

Career 
Jens works on a cold-gas subsystem for Mars 2020. She is also designing the propulsion systems for interplanetary SmallSat missions.

Jens is involved with several initiatives to increase Australia's investment in the space industry. She appeared on Australia's Science Channel as an expert discussing Elon Musk's Mars plan. She took part in the Australia SXSW Festival. She supports Tech Girls Canada. In 2018 Jens was listed as a Game Changer by Vogue (magazine).

References 

Space scientists
Women space scientists
Australian women engineers
21st-century women engineers
University of Melbourne alumni
Stanford University alumni
1984 births
Living people